Dawn Patrol is a 2014 American thriller film directed by Daniel Petrie Jr. and written by Rachel Long and Brian Pittman. The film stars Scott Eastwood, Rita Wilson, Kim Matula, Chris Brochu, Julie Carmen and Jeff Fahey. The film was released on June 5, 2015, by Alchemy.

Plot
John (Scott Eastwood) is a surfer who, after avenging his brother's murder, discovers he has killed the wrong man and joins the Marine Corps to escape his past. This will come to haunt him even here, in a distant desert, where the protagonist will have to survive a sniper unleashed on his trail.

Cast
 Scott Eastwood as John
 Rita Wilson as Shelia
 Kim Matula as Donna
 Chris Brochu as Ben
 Julie Carmen as Laura Rivera
 Jeff Fahey as "Trick"
 Gabriel De Santi as Miguel
 James C. Burns as Kevie
 Dendrie Taylor as Vicki
 Matt Meola as Gary
 Miles Elliot as Cecil
 Frankie Stone as Jeanette
 Daz Crawford as Charles
 Sean O'Bryan as Mace
 Sewell Whitney as Butler
 Archer Moller as Ben Jr.
 David James Elliott as Jim
 Sally Greenland as Michelle
 Paul Zies as "Dingy"
 Mauricio Mendoza as Detective Campana

Release
The film premiered at the Austin Film Festival on October 25, 2014. The film was released on June 5, 2015, by Alchemy.

References

External links
 
 
 
 

2014 films
2014 thriller films
American thriller films
Films scored by Joe Kraemer
Films directed by Daniel Petrie Jr.
2010s English-language films
2010s American films